In Kaśmir Śaivism the world is described as being composed of four spheres that contain a series of phenomenal elements (tattva). The four  are described to appear by the means of the internal abundance of Śiva's divine powers. Outside the four  is Śiva tattva which is the substrate and essential nature of all the other tattvas.

Projected by the absolute,  is the first step of creation. Also called the pure creation because at this level the divine nature of Śiva is not obscured, it manifests a state of diversity in unity. The divine powers (Śakti) gradually descend from Ānanda Śakti (bliss) to Icchā Śakti (the power of will), Jñāna Śakti (the power of knowledge) and Kriyā Śakti (the power of action), at the same time creating the basis for the dual creation. At this stage, though, the duality is only "in concept"; there is no actual division or limitation yet. This  contains Śakti tattva, Sadāśiva tattva, Iśvara tattva and Śuddha-vidyā tattva (all the pure tattvas except the first one, Śiva tattva).

describes the world as it is perceived from the common human level of consciousness. It contains the śakti of the individual soul: , the intellect (Buddhi tattva), the ego (Ahamkāra tattva), the sensory mind (Manas tattva), the five sense organs (Jñānendriya), the five organs of action (Karmendriya), the five subtle essences (Tanmātra) and the last four physical elements (Mahābhutā) : Ākāśa tattva, Vāyu tattva, Tejas tattva and Jala tattva.

is the terminal point of creation – solid matter. There is only one tattva in this sphere: .

See also
The 36 tattvas
Trika
Turiya

References

Kashmir Shaivism
Hindu philosophical concepts
Spiritual faculties
Hindu tantra